Nina Hamnett (14 February 1890 – 16 December 1956) was a Welsh artist and writer, and an expert on sailors' chanteys, who became known as the Queen of Bohemia.

Early life 
Hamnett was born in Shirley House, Picton Road in the small coastal town of Tenby, Pembrokeshire, Wales.  Her father George Hamnett was an army officer, born in Madras (now Chennai), India.  Her mother Mary was born in St. John's, Newfoundland and Labrador. Nina was sent to a private boarding school at Westgate-on-Sea before moving on aged 12, to the Royal School for Daughters of Officers of the Army in Bath, Somerset from 1902 to 1905. Her father was dishonourably discharged from the army and took work as a taxi driver. Her education had to be funded by her aunts and by a loan against a future bequest. From 1906 to 1907 she studied at the Pelham Art School and then at the London School of Art until 1910. In 1914 she went to Montparnasse, Paris to study at Marie Vassilieff's Academy.

While studying in London she met and posed for Henri Gaudier-Brzeska who sculpted a series of nude bronzes. During this period she became friendly with Olivia Shakespear and Ezra Pound. She went on to have a love affair with Brzeska, and later with Amedeo Modigliani and Roger Fry.

On her first night in the Bohemian community she went to the café La Rotonde where the man at the next table introduced himself as "Modigliani, painter and Jew". In addition to making close friends with Modigliani, Pablo Picasso, Serge Diaghilev, and Jean Cocteau, she stayed for a while at La Ruche, where many of the leading members of the avant-garde lived at the time. In Montparnasse in 1914 she also met her future husband, the Norwegian artist Edgar de Bergen, who later changed his name to Roald Kristian to sound less German. She would remain married for forty years but her relationship with her husband lasted only three years. In 1916 her husband was deported as an unregistered alien.

Her work was well regarded by Walter Sickert who endeavoured to advise her on her painting but she lacked his dedication and she revelled in not taking advice. Sickert used her as a model and also painted her with her husband in 1915–16 in The Little Tea Party: Nina Hamnett and Roald Kristian.

Flamboyant lifestyle 

Flamboyantly unconventional, and openly bisexual, Hamnett once danced nude on a Montparnasse café table just for the "hell of it".  She drank heavily, was sexually promiscuous, and kept numerous lovers and close associations within the artistic community. Very quickly, she became a well-known bohemian personality throughout Paris and modelled for many artists. Her reputation soon reached back to London, where for a time, she went to work making or decorating fabrics, clothes, murals, furniture, and rugs at the Omega Workshops, which was directed by Roger Fry, Vanessa Bell, and Duncan Grant.

Her artistic creations were widely exhibited during World War I, including at the Royal Academy in London as well as the Salon d'Automne in Paris. Back in England, she taught at the Westminster Technical Institute from 1917 to 1918. After Kristian left, she took up with another free spirit, composer E. J. Moeran.

From the mid-1920s until the end of World War II, the area known as Fitzrovia was London's main Bohemian artistic centre. The place took its name from the popular Fitzroy Tavern on the corner of Charlotte and Windmill Streets that formed the area's centre. Home of the café life in Fitzrovia, it was Hamnett's favourite hangout as well as that of her friend from her home town, Augustus John, and later another Welshman, the poet Dylan Thomas.

Later life 
In 1932 Hamnett published Laughing Torso, a tale of her bohemian life, which became a bestseller in the UK and US. The notorious occultist Aleister Crowley unsuccessfully sued her and the publisher for libel over allegations of black magic made in her book.

Although she won the case, the situation profoundly affected her for the remainder of her life. Alcoholism would soon overtake her many talents and the tragic "Queen of the Fitzroy" spent a good part of the last few decades of her life at the bar (usually that of the Fitzroy Tavern), trading anecdotes for drinks.

Twenty-three years after her first book Laughing Torso was published, Hamnett, in poor health, released a follow-up book titled: Is She a Lady?.

Hamnett died in 1956 from complications after falling out of her apartment window and being impaled on the fence forty feet below. The great debate has always been whether it was a suicide attempt or merely a drunken accident. Her last words were "Why don't they let me die?"

The American novelist Julius Horwitz (1920–1986) portrayed Nina Hamnett in his 1964 novel about London during World War Two titled Can I Get There By Candlelight.   Horwitz was stationed outside of London during World War Two and was befriended by Hamnett as a young soldier when he would go into London on a three-day pass. A biography, Nina Hamnett: Queen of Bohemia, by Denise Hooker was published in 1986. In 2011, Hamnett was the subject of a short film by writer/director Chris Ward What Shall We Do with the Drunken Sailor starring Siobhan Fahey. In November 2019, the Fitzrovia Chapel hosted an exhibition called Nina Hamnett - 'Everybody was Furious'.

See also
 Betty May
 List of Bloomsbury Group people

References

External links

 
 
 Photograph of Nina Hamnett
 Nina Hamnett wearing an Omega cloak (left)

1890 births
1956 deaths
20th-century Welsh LGBT people
20th-century Welsh painters
20th-century Welsh women artists
Bisexual painters
Bisexual women
British artists' models
Deaths from falls
Welsh LGBT painters
Welsh bisexual writers
Modern artists
People educated at the Royal School for Daughters of Officers of the Army
People from Tenby
Welsh women painters